Řikonín is a municipality and village in Brno-Country District in the South Moravian Region of the Czech Republic. It has about 60 inhabitants.

Gallery

References

Villages in Brno-Country District